Roy Lee Jackson (born May 1, 1954) is a former Major League Baseball pitcher likely best remembered for his stint with the Toronto Blue Jays in the early 80s.

Early years
Jackson was born in Opelika, Alabama. He was drafted by the Houston Astros upon graduation from Opelika High School in the 12th round of the 1972 Major League Baseball draft, but did not sign. Instead, he attended Tuskegee University. After three years with the Tuskegee Golden Tigers college baseball team, he signed as an amateur free agent with the New York Mets.

New York Mets
He received a no decision in his major league debut against the Montreal Expos, pitching 5.2 innings and allowing three earned runs. All told, he made four starts over the remainder of the season, losing twice to the St. Louis Cardinals.

September call-ups seemed to be a theme in Jackson's Mets career. He spent the following two seasons in the minors, getting a call up in September each time. In , he was used more in relief, and earned his first win against the Cardinals.

He spent roughly half the  season in the majors. On July 19, he pitched his only career complete game victory against the Cincinnati Reds, and notched his only career extra base hit off Charlie Leibrandt. He would lose his next four starts, however, and be moved into the bullpen. On September 13, he eaned his first career save against the Chicago Cubs, pitching three innings of one hit ball. During the off season, he was traded to the Toronto Blue Jays for infielder Bob Bailor.

Toronto Blue Jays
In his first full season in the majors, Jackson was used exclusively in relief. On April 13, he entered in the eighth with the bases loaded and one out against the New York Yankees. He got a double play, then pitched a scoreless ninth for his first save on the season. He was 1-2 with a 3.05 ERA and two saves when a strike interrupted the  season. When play resumed, he proved to be the most reliable arm in manager Bobby Mattick's bullpen. He allowed just three runs in 17.2 innings pitched and earned five saves. He led Jays relievers with 62 innings pitched and a 2.61 ERA. His seven saves were second to Joey McLaughlin.

He pitched the ninth and tenth innings for the win when the second game of the season went into extra innings. On May 30, he and Jim Gott combined on a one hit shutout of the Baltimore Orioles, which coincidentally, also happen to be the first game of Cal Ripken's 2.632 consecutive games played streak. On September 28, Jackson pitched five innings of no hit ball against the Minnesota Twins for his eighth and final victory of the season. All told, he went 8-7 with six saves as a reliever. His 2.55 ERA in 88.1 innings out of the bullpen was far and away the best among Blue Jay relievers. His 97 total innings pitched and 71 strikeouts were career highs.

In , Jackson went a career best 8-3. In , he had a career best ten saves. Both seasons, he led Jays relievers in innings pitched (92 and 86, respectively). Despite these numbers, he was released in Spring training .

San Diego Padres
Shortly after his release from the Jays, Jackson signed a minor league deal with the Baltimore Orioles. He was 1-1 with an even 3.00 ERA for the International League's Rochester Red Wings when he was deal to the San Diego Padres for second baseman Alan Wiggins. After three appearances with the Las Vegas Stars, Jackson was back in the majors.

He went 2-3 with a 2.70 ERA, and won his first start in two years, pitching five innings of two hit ball against his former club, the Mets.

Minnesota Twins
The Padres released him the following Spring, and he signed with the Twins. He had one win and one save in his one season in Minnesota.

Career stats

Jackson is also an exceptional singer, and has performed "The Star-Spangled Banner" and "O Canada" before ballgames. His 1984 Fleer Baseball Card (#158) captures him performing one of the anthems before a game. He is now the pastor of the New Creation Service Center in Opelika.

References

Roy Lee Jackson inducted into the 2020 College Baseball Hall of Fame;
Former Tuskegee star named to College Baseball Hall of Fame
 › stories › former-tuskegee-st...

External links
, or The Ultimate Mets Database
Venezuelan Winter League

 Roy Lee Jackson at SABR (Baseball BioProject)

1954 births
Living people
African-American baseball players
Águilas del Zulia players
American expatriate baseball players in Canada
Baseball players from Alabama
Denver Zephyrs players
Jackson Mets players
Las Vegas Stars (baseball) players
Lynchburg Mets players
Major League Baseball pitchers
Marion Mets players
Minnesota Twins players
New York Mets players
People from Opelika, Alabama
Rochester Red Wings players
San Diego Padres players
Tiburones de La Guaira players
American expatriate baseball players in Venezuela
Tidewater Tides players
Toronto Blue Jays players
Tuskegee Golden Tigers baseball players
Tuskegee University alumni
Wausau Mets players
21st-century African-American people
20th-century African-American sportspeople
National College Baseball Hall of Fame inductees